Karen Alexander may refer to:
 Karen Alexander (fashion model) (born c. 1966)
 Karen Alexander (singer) (born 1946)
 Karen Alexander (environmentalist) (born 1948)